Dangerous Game is a 1987 Australian slasher film directed by Stephen Hopkins.

Plot
Jack Hayward (Marcus Graham) is a computer hacker who breaks into a department store one night with his friends for thrills. They are soon locked in by former cop, turned security guard, Patrick Murphy (Steven Grives) who had recently been suspended from his job because of Jack and his friends. This cat-and-mouse game becomes a fight for survival when Tony (John Polson), one of Jack's friends, is murdered by Murphy, and his friends are next.

Cast
 Miles Buchanan as David
 Marcus Graham as Jack
 Steven Grives as Patrick Murphy
 Kathryn Walker as Kathryn
 Sandie Lillingston as Ziggy
 John Polson as Tony

Production
The set built by Igor Nay was one of the largest ever built for an Australian film.

Reception
According to Stephen Hopkins, the film sold well at Cannes because "at that time it was quite cool to be Australian."

Accolades

References

External links
 
 
 Dangerous Game at Oz Movies

1987 films
1980s slasher films
1987 thriller films
Australian independent films
Australian slasher films
1980s English-language films
Films directed by Stephen Hopkins
Films set in department stores
Films shot in Sydney
Murder in films
1987 horror films
Australian horror thriller films
Australian horror drama films
1987 directorial debut films
1980s Australian films